Acasto is an unincorporated community in Clark County, in the U.S. state of Missouri.

History
A post office called Acasto was established in 1857, and remained in operation until 1905. The community has the name of the local Acasto family.

References

Unincorporated communities in Clark County, Missouri
1857 establishments in Missouri
Unincorporated communities in Missouri